Geranial dehydrogenase (GaDH, geoB (gene)) is an enzyme with systematic name geranial:NAD+ oxidoreductase. This enzyme catalyses the following chemical reaction

 geranial + H2O + NAD+  geranate + NADH + H+

Does not act on neral.

References

External links 
 

EC 1.2.1